Qualification for Judo at the 2012 Summer Olympics will be based on the world ranking list prepared by the International Judo Federation ("IJF") on 10 May 2012.
The top 22 men or 14 women from the world rankings in each division qualify, subject to a limit of 1 judoka per National Olympic Committee ("NOC") per division.
Further continental quotas (Europe 25, Africa 24, Pan-America 21, Asia 20 and Oceania 10 across both sexes and all divisions) also qualify subject to an overall limit of 1 judoka per NOC and 2 judokas per division from each continent. The qualification is allocated to the athlete.

Qualification summary

Men's events 
The following is the qualification summary.

Extra-lightweight (60 kg)

Half-lightweight (66 kg)

Lightweight (73 kg)

Half-middleweight (81 kg)

Middleweight (90 kg)

Half-heavyweight (100 kg)

Heavyweight (+100 kg)

Women's events

Extra-lightweight (48 kg)

Half-lightweight (52 kg)

Lightweight (57 kg)

Half-middleweight (63 kg)

Middleweight (70 kg)

Half-heavyweight (78 kg)

Heavyweight (+78 kg)

References

Qualification for the 2012 Summer Olympics
Qualification
2012
Olympics, Qualification